Walter Miller was a New Zealand professional rugby league footballer who played in the 1910s.

Playing career
Miller represented New Zealand on their 1913 tour of Australia.

References

New Zealand national rugby league team players
New Zealand rugby league players
Place of birth missing
Place of death missing
Rugby league fullbacks
Wellington rugby league team players
Year of birth missing
Year of death missing